Eleonora Alvisi (born 13 March 2003) is an Italian tennis player.

She has a career-high ITF juniors ranking of 68, achieved on 6 May 2019.

Alvisi won the 2020 French Open girls' doubles event, partnering Lisa Pigato. They defeated the Russian pairing of Maria Bondarenko and Diana Shnaider in the final.

ITF Circuit finals

Singles: 1 (title)

Junior Grand Slam finals

Girls' doubles

References

External links
 
 

2003 births
Living people
Italian female tennis players
Grand Slam (tennis) champions in girls' doubles
French Open junior champions
21st-century Italian women